Philippe Sylvestre Dufour (born Manosque 1622, died Vevey (Canton de Vaud) 1687) was a French Protestant apothecary, banker, collector, and author based in Lyon.

Publications 
Philippe Sylvestre Dufour published two works.

 De l'usage du caphé, du thé et du chocolate, Lyon, Jean Girin et Barthélémy Rivière, 1671. 
 Instruction morale d'un père à son fils, qui part pour un long voyage : ou, Maniere aisée de former un jeune homme à toutes fortes de vertus, Lyon, Antoine Cellier fils, 1678.

1622 births
1687 deaths
Writers from Lyon
17th-century French male writers
Businesspeople from Lyon